The One Hundred Twenty-second Ohio General Assembly was the legislative body of the state of Ohio in 1997 and 1998. In this General Assembly, both the Ohio Senate and the Ohio House of Representatives were controlled by the Ohio Republican Party.  In the Senate, there were 21 Republicans and 12 Democrats. In the House, there were 60 Republicans and 39 Democrats. It used redistricted legislative districts from the 1990 United States Census.

Major events

Vacancies
January 6, 1997: Senator Dennis Kucinich (D-23rd) resigns to take a seat in the United States House of Representatives.
February 5, 1997: Senator Joseph Vukovich (D-33rd) resigns to take a seat on the Ohio 7th District Court of Appeals.
February 5, 1997: Representative Ron Mottl (D-20th) resigns.
February 8, 1997: Senator Jan Michael Long (D-17th) resigns to take a seat on the Probate Court of Pickaway County, Ohio.
February 8, 1997: Representative Mike Shoemaker (D-91st) resigns to take a seat in the Ohio Senate.
August 8, 1997: Representative Bill Thompson (R-1st) resigns to take a seat on the Ohio Industrial Commission.
October 14, 1997: Representative Mike Fox (R-59th) resigns to become a Butler County, Ohio Commissioner.
December 5, 1997: Senator Karen Gillmor (R-26th) resigns to become a member of the State Employment Relations Board.
January 4, 1998: Representative Lloyd Lewis Jr. resigns to become City Commissioner of Dayton, Ohio.
February 20, 1998: Senator Nancy Dix (R-31st) resigns.
February 20, 1998: Representative Jay Hottinger (R-77th) resigns to become state Senator of the 31st District.
March 30, 1998: Representative Jim Mason (R-25th) resigns to become a judge on the 10th District Court of Appeals.
May 12, 1998: Representative Rocco Colonna (R-18th) resigns.
September 16, 1998: Representative Frank Sawyer (D-79th) resigns due to health concerns.
December 8, 1998: Representative Mike Verich (D-66th) resigns.
December 16, 1998: Senator Jeffrey Johnson (D-21st) resigns.

Appointments
January 6, 1997: Patrick Sweeney appointed to the 23rd Senatorial District due to the resignation of Senator Dennis Kucinich.
February 5, 1997: Mike Shoemaker is appointed to the 17th Senatorial District due to the resignation of Senator Jan Michael Long.
February 5, 1997: Ron Mottl is appointed to the 20th House District due to the resignation of Representative Ron Mottl.
February 8, 1997: Bob Hagan is appointed to the 33rd Senatorial District due to the resignation of Senator Joseph Vukovich.
February 8, 1997: Joseph P. Sulzer is appointed to the 91st House District due to the resignation of Mike Shoemaker
August 8, 1997: John Willamowski is appointed to the 1st House District due to the resignation of Bill Thompson
October 15, 1997: Greg Jolivette is appointed to the 59th House District due to the resignation of Mike Fox.
December 5, 1997: Larry Mumper is appointed to the 26th Senatorial District due to the resignation of Senator Karen Gillmor.
January 6, 1998: Dixie Allen is appointed to the 38th House District due to the resignation of Lloyd Lewis Jr.
February 20, 1998: David R. Evans is appointed to the 77th House District due to the resignation of Jay Hottinger.
February 20, 1998: Jay Hottinger is appointed to the 31st Senatorial District due to the resignation of Senator Nancy Dix.
May 1, 1998: David Goodman is appointed to the 25th House District due to the resignation of Jim Mason.
June 23, 1998: Erin Sullivan is appointed to the 18th House District due to the resignation of Rocco Colonna.
September 16, 1998: William J. Hartnett is appointed to the 79th House District due to the resignation of Frank Sawyer.
December 8, 1998: Chris Verich is appointed to the 66th House District due to the resignation of Mike Verich.

Senate

Leadership

Majority leadership
 President of the Senate: Richard Finan
 President pro tempore of the Senate: Robert R. Cupp
 Assistant pro tempore: Eugene J. Watts
 Whip: Nancy Dix

Minority leadership
 Leader: Ben Espy
 Assistant Leader: Linda J. Furney
 Whip: Jeffrey Johnson
 Assistant Whip: Leigh Herington

Members of the 122nd Ohio Senate

House of Representatives

Leadership

Majority leadership
 Speaker of the House: Jo Ann Davidson
 President pro tempore of the House: William G. Batchelder
 Floor Leader: Randy Gardner
 Assistant Majority Floor Leader: Pat Tiberi
 Majority Whip: Jim Buchy
 Assistant Majority Whip: Bill Harris

Minority leadership
 Leader: Ross Boggs
 Assistant Leader: Johnnie Maier
 Whip: Charleta Taveres
 Assistant Whip: Tom Roberts

Members of the 122nd Ohio House of Representatives

Appt.- Member was appointed to current House Seat

See also
Ohio House of Representatives membership, 126th General Assembly
Ohio House of Representatives membership, 125th General Assembly

References
Ohio House of Representatives official website
Project Vote Smart – State House of Ohio
Map of Ohio House Districts
Ohio District Maps 2002–2012
Ohio House of Representatives: November 5, 1996  Ohio Secretary of State

Ohio legislative sessions
Ohio
Ohio
1997 in Ohio
1998 in Ohio
de:Repräsentantenhaus von Ohio